Jin-hyuk, also spelled Jin-hyeok or Jin-hyok, is a Korean masculine given name. The meaning differs based on the hanja used to write each syllable of the name. There are 48 hanja with the reading "jin" and nine hanja with the reading "hyuk" and on the South Korean government's official list of hanja which may be registered for used in given names.

People with this name include:
Oh Jin-hyek (born 1981), South Korean archer
Kang Jin-hyok (born 1985), North Korean footballer
Kim Tae-ho (born 1986), stage name Choi Jin-hyuk, South Korean actor
Kim Jin-hyok (born 1987), North Korean artistic gymnast
Kim Jin-hyeok (born 1989), South Korean Greco-Roman wrestler
No Jin-hyuk (born 1989), South Korean baseball player
Ri Jin-hyok (born 1989), North Korean footballer
Jeong Jin-hyeok (born 1991), South Korean long distance runner
Lee Jin-hyuk (born 1996), South Korean singer and actor, member of UP10TION

See also
List of Korean given names

References

Korean masculine given names